Dariusz Michalak (born July 21, 1966) is a Polish former footballer who played as a midfielder.

Career
From the age of 7, he trained football in Stal Stalowa Wola, of which he is a home-grown. Among his coaches was Rudolf Patkoló. In the colors of "Stalówka" he was promoted twice to Ekstraklasa (1990–91 and 1993–94 seasons). He had his direct share in the first of these successes, when on June 19, 1991, in the last game of the I liga season, which was also a derby match with Siarka Tarnobrzeg, he scored a goal (as Stal won 2-0),  thus ensuring Stal's first place competitions. In the colors of Stal he played in the highest league of the 1991–92 and 1994–95 editions. In total, he played 25 games in Ekstraklasa, in which he scored two goals. 

In the summer of 1995 he became a player of the III liga side Stal Sanok for the 1995–96 season. After the autumn round in this team he returned to Stal Stalowa Wola. He was an active footballer until the age of 40 as the Sokół Nisko's player. He was a right-footed athlete.

After completing his professional career, he worked in Huta Stalowa Wola. As a coach, he led the Sokół Nisko junior team and was a playing coach for the senior team until 2006. He was also the coach of youth groups in his home Stal Stalowa Wola.

Private life
He is the son of Jan Michalak, the ZKS Stal Stalowa Wola's boxer.

Notes

References

External links
 

1966 births
Living people
Polish footballers
Stal Stalowa Wola players
Sokół Nisko players
Avia Świdnik players
Resovia (football) players
Place of birth missing (living people)
Association football midfielders
Ekstraklasa players
I liga players
III liga players